The Memorial to the Victims of Communism – Canada, a Land of Refuge is a controversial monument that  is currently under construction in Ottawa, Ontario, Canada. It was originally to be erected on a site between the Supreme Court of Canada and the National Library of Canada but in December 2015, Canadian Heritage Minister Mélanie Joly suggested that the National Capital Commission instead approve a  500 square metre site half a kilometre to the west, in the Garden of the Provinces and Territories.  Under the revised timeline, a national competition was held in 2016 and 2017 to select a new design for the monument. The site was dedicated in a ceremony held on November 2, 2017. Construction began in early November 2019, and was expected to be completed by the summer of 2020, but by the end of 2022 was still not finished, with no construction progress made in 2022.

Joly complained that the previous Harper government had made the project too controversial. The new Liberal government has moved the site and cut its budget. She stated:
Commemorative monuments play a key role in reflecting the character, identity, history and values of Canadians.  They should be places of reflection, inspiration and learning, not shrouded in controversy."

The winning design was announced in May 2017 as Arc of Memory designed by Toronto architect Paul Raff in partnership with designer and arborist Michael A. Ormston-Holloway, and landscape architects Brett Hoornaert and Luke Kairys, and was described by the selection committee as follows:
The Arc of Memory features two gently curving wall-like metal frames totalling 21 metres in length and almost 4 metres in height. The walls support more than 4000 short bronze rods densely arranged along 365 steel fins, each one pointing at a unique angle of the sun, for every hour of every day, across a year.

The memorial would be split in the middle at winter solstice, the darkest day of the year, inviting visitors to step through in a metaphorical journey from darkness and oppression to lightness and liberty.

Origins
In 2007, Secretary of State for Multiculturalism Jason Kenney toured Masaryktown, a private park owned by the Czech and Slovak community in Toronto, with Czech ambassador Pavel Vosalik and saw Crucified Again, a statue of a tortured man crucified on a hammer and sickle, commemorating victims of Soviet oppression. Kenney commented to the ambassador that the public should be able to see such a monument and they discussed the idea of creating a memorial in Ottawa, Ontario. 
 
Tribute to Liberty was founded the next year as a charity with the mission of building a monument to the victims of Communism. Its 9-member board is composed of members of ethnocultural communities and whose families originate from various former or still Communist states. The founding chair of the group was Philip Leong who had run as a candidate for the conservative Canadian Alliance in the 2000 federal election and is described by the National Post as a friend of Kenney's and an admirer of Stephen Harper. Alide Forstmanis, the group's treasurer who has also served as chair, ran for the Conservative Party of Canada nomination in Kitchener—Waterloo in 2007 while another former director, Wladyslaw Lizon was later elected a Conservative Member of Parliament.

The National Capital Commission, in 2009, approved the proposal to build the monument in the National Capital Region with a specific site to be determined later. It suggested modifying the memorial's name, which was originally "A Monument to Victims of Totalitarian Communism: Canada, A Land of Refuge", so that it would commemorate victims of oppressive regimes generally but Tribute to Liberty refused, however the term "totalitarian" was dropped.

Site and design
In 2011, the National Capital Commission approved a site for the monument at the Garden of the Provinces and Territories however, in 2012, the then-Conservative federal government announced that the memorial would be built instead on a more prominent parcel of land between the Supreme Court of Canada and the National Library of Canada that had been designated for over a century as the future location of a new federal court. In 2014, Chief Justice Beverley McLachlin expressed her concern that the memorial "could send the wrong message within the judicial precinct, unintentionally conveying a sense of bleakness and brutalism that is inconsistent with a space dedicated to the administration of justice."

A design was selected later in 2014 consisting of a series of folded concrete rows with 100 million "memory squares" to commemorate victims. A member of the design selection jury, architect Shirley Blumberg, complained that the pool of proposals the jury had to select from was "poor" and that "the one that was selected by the jury was, I think, particularly brutalist and visceral."

In June 2015, the National Capital Commission revised the design, reducing its size so that it would cover 37% of the site rather than 60%, reducing the number of folded concrete rows to five from seven, reducing its height from 14 metres to 8 metres, and moving it further back from Wellington Street and changing its focus to telling the story of refugees from Communist states.

New government and scrapping of original proposal
The Conservative government of Stephen Harper had pledged $3 million for the construction of the project, with the remaining amount to be raised by Tribute to Liberty. However, following the 2015 federal election, which resulted in a new Liberal government led by Justin Trudeau taking office, it was reported that no government money would be going towards the project. Subsequently, however, it was announced that construction of the project had been capped at a total cost of $3 million, reduced from $5.5 million, with the Department of Canadian Heritage's contribution to be capped at $1.5 million and the rest to be provided by Tribute to Liberty, thus reducing the government's financial commitment to half its previous pledge.

In addition, Heritage Minister Joly has asked that a new design be chosen for the monument with the general public being involved  "from the outset of the design process through to final selection."

On December 17, 2015, the government requested that the site of the monument be moved to the Garden of the Provinces and Territories and that a new design be chosen. On January 20, 2016, the National Capital Commission rescinded its previous approval for the Supreme Court of Canada site. As well, the Royal Architectural Institute of Canada (RAIC) announced that it had discontinued its court case against the NCC which would have challenged its approval of the Supreme Court of Canada site stating: "The RAIC is delighted to be ending the legal proceedings and look forward to a more appropriate commemoration being proposed."

An online survey asking Canadians their opinions on the proposed monument was opened by the federal government in February 2016; the results were passed on to the design teams. The designs of the five finalists for the monument, renamed Canada: A Place of Refuge, were unveiled on March 2, 2017, with the winner was announced in May. The memorial will recognize Canada's "role as a place of refuge for people fleeing injustice and persecution, and honour the millions oppressed by communist regimes." The monument was expected to be completed by late 2018 or early 2019, but work finally commenced in November 2019.

Donations honouring Nazi collaborators
In July 2021, while the monument was still under construction, CBC News reported that Tribute to Liberty received some donations honouring fascists and Nazi collaborators, as evidenced out by the project's on-line list. The donations seem intended to sanitize or commemorate eastern European Nazi collaborators who were involved in the deportation and murder of Jews and other groups under Hitler's Final Solution, like Ustaša leader Ante Pavelić and Ukrainian Insurgent Army leader Roman Shukhevych. Ludwik Klimkowski, chair of Tribute to Liberty stated that questions about who will be commemorated "are premature" since both Tribute to Liberty and the Department of Canadian Heritage are still reviewing the final list of names which will be included on the memorial. He did not confirm that the money to commemorate Nazi collaborators was refused and returned, saying it would be "premature to comment".

References

External links
  

Memorials to victims of communism
Monuments and memorials in Ottawa
Political controversies in Canada
Proposed monuments and memorials